WGLH (103.9 FM) is a Christian radio station licensed to Hawkinsville, Georgia, broadcasting at 103.9 MHz.

The station previously went by the call letters WCEH-FM, WQSY, WRPG and WQXZ.

In March 2017, WQXZ was sold to Educational Media Foundation (EMF) by Georgia Eagle Media for $150,000. The station was turned off for the format change on May 5 at 6 PM.

A few days later, the station returned to air broadcasting the contemporary Christian (K-Love) format. The purchase by EMF was consummated on May 10, 2017.

References

External links

Educational Media Foundation radio stations
K-Love radio stations
GLH